Kristiana Manu'a (born 3 September 1995) is a New Zealand-born Australian netball player in the Suncorp Super Netball league, playing for Giants Netball. 

Manu'a was born in Wellington, the capital city of New Zealand, though moved with family to Liverpool, New South Wales as a baby. She began her netball career back in New Zealand in 2015, playing for the Waikato Bay of Plenty Magic. Despite representing Australia at underage level, Manu'a was approached by Netball New Zealand officials to represent the New Zealand national team during her time at the Magic. She remained an Australian player however and made her debut for the Australian national team in the 2016 Quad Series.

Manu'a was set to play for Giants Netball in 2017, though missed the entire season due to a ruptured Achilles tendon sustained in the off-season.  She eventually made her debut for the Giants in the 2018 season.

References

External links
 Netball Australia profile
 Suncorp Super Netball profile
 Interview with Giants Netball player Kristiana Manu'a – YouTube

1995 births
Australian netball players
Waikato Bay of Plenty Magic players
Giants Netball players
Living people
Suncorp Super Netball players
Netball players from New South Wales
Australia international netball players
New Zealand netball players
Netball New South Wales Blues players
New South Wales state netball league players
Central Pulse players
New Zealand international Fast5 players